Antonio Lindbäck (born 5 May 1985 in Rio de Janeiro, Brazil) is a motorcycle speedway rider from Sweden, who competed in the Speedway World Championship and was a member of the Swedish team who won the Speedway World Cup in 2004 and 2015.

Career highlights 
Lindbäck made his international debut in 2004 with firstly a wild card ride in the Speedway Grand Prix series but he made a bigger impression in the Speedway World Cup riding for the Swedish team. He became the European Under-19 Champion in 2004 and Scandinavian Under-21 Champion in 2005.

In October 2004, during the Speedway Grand Prix Qualification he won the GP Challenge, which ensured that he claimed a permanent slot for the 2005 Grand Prix. He duly made his full SGP debut in 2005 finishing 10th both in that season and the subsequent 2006 championship.

Prior to the final 2007 Speedway Grand Prix round in Gelsenkirchen, it was announced that Lindbäck had decided to retire from speedway. However, he made a quick comeback competing for Vargarna in the Swedish second tier Allsvenskan and he was a major force in bringing the club to the play off final. Before the start of the 2009 season, he moved to Piraterna.

Lindbäck qualified for the 2012 Speedway Grand Prix via the Grand Prix Challenge and won his first Grand Prix in the 2012 Speedway Grand Prix of Italy in Terenzano. He was also included in the Swedish national team.

On 13 November 2020, Lindbäck announced his retirement for a second time but once again returned and in 2022 rode for Masarna and Valsarna in the Swedish leagues. He helped Valsarna win the 2022 Allsvenskan during the 2022 Swedish Speedway season.

Results

Speedway Grand Prix

SGP Podiums 
 Copenhagen 2005 - 3rd place
 Prague 2006 - 3rd place
 Daugavpils 2006 - 2nd place
 Gothenburg 2009 - 3rd place
 Gothenburg 2011 - 3rd place
 Terenzano 2011 - 3rd place
 Terenzano 2012 - 1st place
 Cardiff 2012 - 3rd place
 Målilla 2012 - 3rd place
 Toruń 2012 - 1st place
 Målilla 2015 - 3rd place
 Cardiff 2016 - 1st place

See also 
 List of Speedway Grand Prix riders
 Sweden national speedway team

References 

1985 births
Living people
Brazilian emigrants to Sweden
Swedish speedway riders
Swedish people of Brazilian descent
Speedway World Cup champions
Individual Speedway Junior European Champions
Belle Vue Aces riders
Poole Pirates riders